The Samuel F. Glass House is a property in Franklin, Tennessee that dates from 1859.  It was listed on the National Register of Historic Places in 1988.  It has also been known as Pleasant View.

Other contenders for the largest antebellum plantation are the plantations of Beechwood Hall (the H. G. W. Mayberry House) and of Ravenswood (the James H. Wilson House), which are also NRHP-listed.

It includes Greek Revival, Italianate, Central hall plan and other architecture.

The NRHP eligibility of the property was addressed in a 1988 study of Williamson County historical resources.

The house was part of a larger farm, Pleasant View Farm which also contains an archeological site, a Mississippian culture village site.

References

Houses on the National Register of Historic Places in Tennessee
Houses in Franklin, Tennessee
Greek Revival houses in Tennessee
Italianate architecture in Tennessee
Central-passage houses in Tennessee
Houses completed in 1859
National Register of Historic Places in Williamson County, Tennessee